The Dr. Herbert H. Hughes House is a historic house located at 1229 West Powell Boulevard in Gresham, Oregon.

Description and history 
The -story house was built in 1922 and was designed by architect Frank Gibbs. It displays characteristics of the Colonial Style in its symmetry, side facing gable roof, large brick chimney, fanlight eyebrow dormers, central arched entrance porch, massive Doric porch posts, multi-pane windows, the decorative broken pediment over the wide multi-pane entrance door, and wood shingle siding.

It was listed on the National Register of Historic Places on September 5, 2001.

See also
 National Register of Historic Places listings in Multnomah County, Oregon

References

External links
 

Buildings and structures in Gresham, Oregon
Colonial Revival architecture in Oregon
Houses completed in 1922
Houses in Multnomah County, Oregon
Houses on the National Register of Historic Places in Oregon
National Register of Historic Places in Gresham, Oregon